Ellipse is a French aircraft manufacturer, located in Étuz. The company specializes in building hang gliders and ultralight trikes.

The company also builds the DTA Diva, DTA Dynamic and DTA Magic ultralight trike wings under contract to DTA sarl.

Aircraft

References

External links

Aircraft manufacturers of France
Hang gliders
Ultralight trikes
Companies based in Bourgogne-Franche-Comté